The Fields Park is an urban greenspace in Portland, Oregon's Pearl District. Construction of the 3.2-acre park began in 2012 and has been estimated to cost up to $4 million.

History
A ceremony to begin construction was held on March 6, 2012. Representatives from Hoyt Street Properties, the Pearl District Neighborhood Association, the Portland Development Commission and Portland Parks & Recreation were in attendance. The park opened on May 6, 2013.

See also
 List of parks in Portland, Oregon

References

External links

 

2013 establishments in Oregon
Parks in Portland, Oregon
Pearl District, Portland, Oregon
Protected areas established in 2013
Urban public parks